Colaptes is a genus of birds in the woodpecker family Picidae. The 14 species are found across the Americas.

Colaptes woodpeckers typically have a brown or green back and wings with black barring, and a beige to yellowish underside, with black spotting or barring. There are usually colorful markings on the head. Many of these birds – particularly the northerly species – are more terrestrial than usual among woodpeckers.

Historically, there has been considerable uncertainty in assigning woodpecker species to genera and it is only by comparing DNA sequences that it has become possible to confidently place many of the species.

Taxonomy
The genus Colaptes was introduced by the Irish zoologist Nicholas Aylward Vigors in 1825 with the northern flicker (Colaptes auratus) as the type species. The name is from the Ancient Greek κολάπτης (kolaptēs) meaning "chiseller". 

The genus forms part of the woodpecker subfamily Picinae and has a sister relationship to the genus Piculus. The genus Colaptes is a member of the tribe Picini and belongs to a clade that contains five genera: Colaptes, Piculus, Mulleripicus, Dryocopus and Celeus. Some of the relationships between the species within Colaptes are uncertain, with various genetic studies reporting slightly different phylogenies, but it is evident that those species with "flicker" in their common name do not form a monophyletic group.

The genus Colaptes contains 14 species. Of these, one species, the Bermuda flicker, is now extinct:

 † Bermuda flicker (Colaptes oceanicus) – extinct, but may have survived into historical times - formerly Bermuda
The online edition of the Handbook of the Birds of the World has split five of the species listed above to give a total of 20 species in the genus. None of the splits were based on results of molecular genetic studies. In addition, the common name of the northern flicker (Colaptes auratus) was changed to the "yellow-shafted flicker". These splits have not been adopted by the online edition of the Clements Checklist of Birds of the World maintained by ornithologists at Cornell University, nor by the American Ornithological Society.

References

External links
 

 
Bird genera
Taxa named by Nicholas Aylward Vigors